The Papakura Sea Eagles are an Auckland rugby league club based in Papakura. The Sea Eagles currently compete in the Fox Memorial competition run by the Auckland Rugby League.

History
The Papakura Rugby League Club formed in 1931. On March 26 they had 60 players enroll to play. They applied to the Papakura Town Board for the use of the reserve at Papakura. This was granted as the entire club had switched over from Rugby Union meaning they had no competition for the field. The council said that if a representative rugby game was being played on the field then the league team could use Prince Edward Park (which later became their home ground and remains so to this day). On Saturday, 18 April they played a practice match with Mount Wellington at Papakura. The match was won by Mt Wellington by 8 points to 5. Papakura's points came from an unconverted try to Johnstone, and I. Wilson kicked a penalty goal.

Their first ever grade wins were in the 1931 and 1932 second grade which was essentially the modern day equivalent of the second division. Some of their early notable players from the early 1930s were Cyril Blacklaws and Mortimer Stephens who both played their junior rugby league for Papakura. They later moved to Newton Rangers to play senior league and were signed by St Helens in England. Blacklaws played 35 games for St Helens from 1935-36 and then signed with Rochdale Hornets, while Stephens played 56 games for St Helens from 1935-37 and also moved to Rochdale Hornets before returning to New Zealand.

They won the Sharman Cup in 1936 by winning the Senior B grade having finished runner up in 1935. They won the Walmsley Shield in 1936 also. In 1937 they once again won the Sharman Cup.

Kiwi Representatives
To date seven players from the club have represented the New Zealand national rugby league team. The first New Zealand player to represent Papakura was Harold Milliken who joined the club in 1940 after playing for New Zealand in 1939 however he did not represent the national side whilst at Papakura.
Bevin Hough: 1950,53;
Brian Lee: 1961,62,63;
Reg Cooke: 1961,64;
Roger Tait: 1965,66,67,
Lyndsay Proctor: 1974,75,
Gary Kemble: 1980,81,82,83,84,85,86;
Kelly Shelford: 1989,90,91.
Jason Taumalolo: 1997

Notable Juniors
Billy Ngawini

Papakura Senior Team Records (1931-1943)
The season record for the most senior men's team in the club.

References

External links
Official Website
Official ARL Site